The Europe/Africa Zone was one of the three zones of the regional Davis Cup competition in 2000.

In the Europe/Africa Zone there were four different tiers, called groups, in which teams competed against each other to advance to the upper tier. The top two teams in Group III advanced to the Europe/Africa Zone Group II in 2001, whereas the bottom two teams were relegated to the Europe/Africa Zone Group IV in 2001.

Participating nations

Draw
 Venue: Tennis Club de Tunis, Tunis, Tunisia
 Date: 24–28 May

Group A

Group B

1st to 4th place play-offs

5th to 8th place play-offs

Final standings

  and  promoted to Group II in 2001.
  and  relegated to Group IV in 2001.

Round robin

Group A

Togo vs. Bosnia and Herzegovina

Malta vs. Georgia

Togo vs. Malta

Bosnia and Herzegovina vs. Georgia

Togo vs. Georgia

Malta vs. Bosnia and Herzegovina

Group B

Yugoslavia vs. Monaco

Botswana vs. Tunisia

Yugoslavia vs. Botswana

Monaco vs. Tunisia

Yugoslavia vs. Tunisia

Monaco vs. Botswana

1st to 4th place play-offs

Semifinals

Bosnia and Herzegovina vs. Monaco

Georgia vs. Yugoslavia

Final

Monaco vs. Yugoslavia

3rd to 4th play-off

Bosnia and Herzegovina vs. Georgia

5th to 8th place play-offs

5th to 8th play-offs

Togo vs. Tunisia

Botswana vs. Malta

5th to 6th play-off

Botswana vs. Togo

7th to 8th play-off

Malta vs. Tunisia

References

External links
Davis Cup official website

Davis Cup Europe/Africa Zone
Europe Africa Zone Group III